Flight 93 is a 2006 American drama television film directed by Peter Markle and written by Nevin Schreiner, which chronicles the events onboard United Airlines Flight 93 during the September 11 attacks in 2001. It premiered on January 30, 2006, on A&E, and was re-broadcast several times throughout 2006.

The film stars Jeffrey Nordling, Colin Glazer, Brennan Elliott, Ty Olsson, Jacqueline Ann Steuart, Laura Mennell, Karen Holness, Barry W. Levy, Biski Gugushe, and Dominic Rains.

The film was rated PG-13 for some violence and emotional depiction during the hijack situation.

Plot 
On the morning of September 11, 2001, First officer LeRoy Homer Jr. gets dressed in his F.A.A. official uniform, kisses his wife and leaves for work. Passengers board United Airlines Flight 93 at Newark Liberty International Airport, including Tom Burnett, Jeremy Glick, Todd Beamer, Mark Bingham, Lauren Grandcolas, Donald Greene, Nicole Miller, and Honor Elizabeth Wainio. Four al-Qaeda terrorists Ziad Jarrah, Saeed al-Ghamdi, Ahmed al-Haznawi and Ahmed al-Nami, also board the flight. The plane takes off from Newark, bound for San Francisco, California.

46 minutes after takeoff, the hijackers make their move; passenger Mark Rothenberg tries to negotiate with the hijackers and is fatally stabbed and the "bomb" is revealed causing mass panic among passengers, the hijackers stab a flight attendant knocking her unconscious before wrestling their way into the cockpit and attacking the pilots. During the struggle with the hijackers, Homer courageously sends out a mayday call before he and Captain Jason Dahl are knocked unconscious. Within minutes, Flight 77 crashes into the Pentagon in Arlington, Virginia.

Aboard Flight 93, the passengers learn from family members via airphones about the attacks on the World Trade Center in New York City and the Pentagon in Washington, D.C.; they decide to take action by organizing a revolt against the four hijackers. Their plan is empowered with the knowledge that passenger Don Greene has experience in flying.

The group pins their hopes on Greene being able at least to control the plane. After passengers arm themselves, pray, and make final phone calls to loved ones, Todd Beamer says, "Let's Roll!". They start their counter-attack, running down the aisle with a food cart. Jarrah shakes the plane violently to throw the passengers off balance, and Flight 93 narrowly misses a private aircraft as the passengers continue their assault, overpowering al-Nami, who is outside the cockpit. After boiling water is thrown at him, al-Nami is killed by Mark Bingham with a blow to the head with the hot water container. Seeing the passengers getting nearer, al-Ghamdi, Jarrah and al-Haznawi prepare to crash the plane, knowing they'll never reach their intended target. The passengers breach the cockpit with the food cart, and as they wrestle with al-Haznawi and al-Ghamdi to get in the cockpit, the two hijackers tell Jarrah to simply crash the plane, rather than to carry on with the rest of their mission. Jarrah puts it into a nosedive, just as the passengers finally gain entrance into the cockpit. The plane inverts, crashing into a field in Shanksville, Pennsylvania, killing everyone on board. Air Traffic Control can be seen and heard desperately calling for any response from Flight 93. Emergency workers then come by to investigate the crash area (denoted by the crater). The film then depicts the passage of time, and with it, the disappearance of the crater.

Cast

Passengers 
 Jeffrey Nordling as Tom Burnett
 Colin Glazer as Jeremy Glick
 Brennan Elliott as Todd Beamer
 Ty Olsson as Mark Bingham
 Jacqueline Ann Steuart as Lauren Grandcolas
 Laura Mennell as Elizabeth Wainio
 Barry W. Levy as Captain Jason Dahl
 Biski Gugush as First Officer LeRoy Homer Jr.
 Michael Robinson as Alan Anthony Beaven

Hijackers 
 Dominic Rains as Ziad Jarrah
 Zak Santiago as Ahmed al-Haznawi
 Shawn Ahmed as Saeed Al-Ghamdi
 Asim Wali as Ahmed al-Nami

Awards 
The film received the award for "Outstanding Sound Editing for a Miniseries, Movie or a Special" at the 2006 Emmy Awards.

 Chris Julian, Foley Artist
 Mark Linden, Sound Editor
 Tara A. Paul, Effects Editor
 Geoff Raffan, Dialog Editor
 Carlos Ramirez, ADR/Dialog Editor
 Joan Rowe, Foley Artist
 David A. Scharf, Dialog Editor
 Harry Snodgrass, Supervising Sound Editor

Home media 
The DVD version was released on June 26, 2006. It came in 3 languages, English, Arabic, and Japanese.

See also 
Flight 93 (disambiguation)
List of cultural references to the September 11 attacks

References

External links 

 by A&E

2006 films
2006 drama films
2000s English-language films
A&E (TV network) original films
American aviation films
American drama television films
American films based on actual events
Drama films based on actual events
Films based on the September 11 attacks
Films directed by Peter Markle
Films set in New Jersey
Films set in Pennsylvania
Films set on airplanes
Films shot in Vancouver
Television films based on actual events
United Airlines Flight 93
2000s American films